Mesua wrayi is a species of flowering plant in the family Calophyllaceae. It is endemic to Peninsular Malaysia.

References

wrayi
Endemic flora of Peninsular Malaysia
Least concern plants
Taxonomy articles created by Polbot